The 2014 Toray Pan Pacific Open was a women's tennis tournament played on outdoor hard courts. It was the 31st edition of the Toray Pan Pacific Open, and part of the Premier Series of the 2014 WTA Tour. It took place at the Ariake Coliseum in Tokyo, Japan, on 15–21 September 2014. Ana Ivanovic won the singles title.

Petra Kvitová was the defending champion, but chose not to participate this year. Ana Ivanovic won the title, defeating Caroline Wozniacki in the final, 6–2, 7–6(7–2). This was Ivanovic's 15th and final title of her career.

Seeds 
The top four seeds received a bye into the second round.

Draw

Finals

Top half

Bottom half

Qualifying

Seeds

Qualifiers

Draw

First qualifier

Second qualifier

Third qualifier

Fourth qualifier

References 
 Main Draw
 Qualifying Draw

Toray Pan Pacific Open Singles
2014 Women's Singles
2014 Toray Pan Pacific Open